FECA may refer to:

 Federal Election Campaign Act, a U.S. federal law regulating political campaign spending and fundraising.
 Federal Employees' Compensation Act, a U.S. national law regarding compensation to federal government employees for work-related injuries
 Family Entertainment and Copyright Act, a U.S. federal law pertaining to copyright
 FecA, the Fe(3+) dicitrate transport protein from E. coli
 First Eukaryotic Common Ancestor